The Gandegg Hut is an alpine hut, located above Zermatt in the canton of Valais.

The hut was built in 1885.

See also
List of buildings and structures above 3000 m in Switzerland

References
Swisstopo topographic maps

External links
Official website

Zermatt
Mountain huts in Switzerland
Buildings and structures completed in 1885
Buildings and structures in Valais
Mountain huts in the Alps
19th-century architecture in Switzerland